Hadena persimilis is a species of moth of the family Noctuidae. It is found in the Balkans, the European part of south-eastern Russia, Ukraine, Turkey, Israel, Armenia, Azerbaijan, Iran, Turkmenistan and Kazakhstan.

Adults are on wing from June to July. There is one generation per year.

The larvae probably feed on capsules of Caryophyllaceae species.

Subspecies
Hadena persimilis persimilis
Hadena persimilis balcanica

External links
 Hadeninae of Israel

Hadena
Moths of Europe
Moths of Asia
Moths described in 1996